Hartlepool Water is a water company that covers the town of Hartlepool in County Durham and surrounding area in the North East of England.  Since 1997 it has been owned by Anglian Water.

Hartlepool Water does not provide sewerage services. These are provided by Northumbrian Water.

The company was originally formed as the Hartlepool Gas and Water Company in 1846, was re-incorporated into Hartlepool Water Ltd in 1995 and its company name, though not brand and business name, was renamed in 2006 as Osprey Water Services Ltd of Anglian Water's head office (Registered Office) retaining company number 3017251.

References

External links
Official website
Anglian Water

Water companies of England
Companies based in County Durham